The Kelantan State Executive Council is the executive authority of the Government of Kelantan, Malaysia. The Council comprises the Menteri Besar, appointed by the Sultan on the basis that he is able to command a majority in the Kelantan State Legislative Assembly, a number of members made up of members of the Assembly, the State Secretary, the State Legal Adviser and the State Financial Officer.

This Council is similar in structure and role to the Cabinet of Malaysia, while being smaller in size. As federal and state responsibilities differ, there are a number of portfolios that differ between the federal and state governments.

Members of the Council are selected by the Menteri Besar, appointed by the Sultan. The Council has no ministry, but instead a number of committees; each committee will take care of certain state affairs, activities and departments. Members of the Council are always the chair of a committee.

Members

Full members 

Members of the Council, since 17 May 2018, are:

Deputy Members 

Deputy Members of the Council, as of 30 April 2021, are:

Ex officio members

See also 
 Sultan of Kelantan
 List of Menteris Besar of Kelantan
 Kelantan State Legislative Assembly

References

External links 
 Kelantan State Government

Government of Kelantan
Kelantan